Gorgonichthys is extinct monospecific genus of large arthrodire placoderm. Fossils are found in the Upper Famennian Cleveland Shales of Late Devonian in Ohio. The type species is Gorgonichthys clarki.

Description
Gorgonichthys had sharp, pointed edges on the dental plates of the upper and lower jaws.

Phylogeny
Gorgonichthys is a member of the clade Aspinothoracidi, which belongs to the clade Pachyosteomorphi, one of the two major clades within Eubrachythoraci. It is closely related to the family Selenosteidae, and could possibly be included in that family. The cladogram below shows the phylogeny of Gorgonichthys:

According to a 2022 Jobbins et al. study, Gorgonichthys was found to be more related to Heintzichthys than Gymnotrachelus, potentially making Gorgonichthys a member of Selenosteidae.

References

Arthrodires
Arthrodire genera
Placoderms of North America
Paleontology in Ohio
Famennian life
Famennian genus first appearances
Famennian genus extinctions